High School is a 1954 Italian coming-of-age comedy-drama film directed by Luciano Emmer.

Plot 
Last year of school for the III C of the Gobetti high school in Rome: the events of the boys and girls who have to face the final exams are intertwined with more or less happy loves, shy disputes and small dramas. Lucia, scion of a rich family, but with a generous and rebellious soul, shares with Andrea, who instead comes from a family of modest conditions, the project for a school newspaper. The contents of the file put them in collision with the principal, but they unite the two youngsters, who eventually fall in love. Their relationship, however, is opposed by Lucia's family, who want her to be paired with the stolid but rich Pupo.

Cast 

Giulia Rubini: Camilla
Ilaria Occhini: Isabella
Anna Maria Sandri: Teresa
Ugo Amaldi: Franco
Ferdinando Cappabianca: Andrea
Franco Santori: Bruno
Paola Borboni: Mother of Bruno
Bartolomeo Rossetti: Valenti  
Antonio Battistella: Father of Giulia
Eriprando Visconti: Carlo
Marcella Rovena: Mother of Camilla
Turi Pandolfini: Professor 
Giuliano Montaldo: Professor
Carlo Bernari: Professor 
Christine Carère: Giovanna
Valeria Moriconi  
Rita Livesi

References

External links

1954 comedy-drama films
1954 films
Italian high school films
Italian comedy-drama films
Italian coming-of-age films
Films directed by Luciano Emmer
Films set in Rome
Italian black-and-white films
1950s Italian films